Lincolnton High School is a high school located in Lincolnton, North Carolina. Its school colors are black and gold.

ACC Barnstorming Tour
In 2011, Lincolnton High School hosted the ACC Barnstorming Tour, in which seniors from Duke, UNC, and NC State play against local area high school basketball players.

Athletics
The school's team name are the Wolves. North Carolina High School Athletic Association (NCHSAA) team state championships include:

 2A Football 2007
 2A Baseball 1995
 2A Football 1993

Notable alumni
 Dennis Byrd, former NFL defensive tackle and 2010 College Football Hall of Fame inductee
 Drew Droege, actor, comedian, writer, and director
 Charles R. Jonas, U.S. Representative from North Carolina for ten terms (1953–1973)
 Barclay Radebaugh, college basketball coach
 Sage Surratt, NFL wide receiver
 C. J. Wilson, former NFL cornerback

References

https://web.archive.org/web/20111005001131/http://www.lincolntimesnews.com/default.asp/?Section=61&VA=24362
https://web.archive.org/web/20110930214256/http://www.gastongazette.com/sports/lincolnton-56554-acc-stars.html
http://www.varsitync.com/articles/lincolnton-4296-prevail-thriller.html

External links

 http://www.maxpreps.com/local/team/photo/thumbnails.aspx?gendersport=boys,football&photogalleryid=58c9ba95-7055-4ddd-ae60-5c2c0294b9f2&schoolid=4deb40b3-7af2-4a20-bbca-a7186fda0e8b#

Public high schools in North Carolina
Schools in Lincoln County, North Carolina